Nathaniel Helfgot (born April 30, 1963) is an American rabbi. He leads Congregation Netivot Shalom of Teaneck, New Jersey, and served as president of the International Rabbinic Fellowship.

Early life 
Helfgot studied at Yeshivat Har Etzion for two years and later attended Yeshiva University, the Azrieli Graduate School, and the Rabbi Isaac Elchanan Theological Seminary, where he obtained his semikhah (rabbinical ordination).

Career
Helfgot is the rabbi of Congregation Netivot Shalom, an Orthodox congregation in Teaneck, New Jersey. He served as president of the International Rabbinic Fellowship. 

Helfgot has taught at the Drisha Institute for Jewish Education, the Frisch School, the Ma'ayanot Yeshiva High School, and the Torah Academy of Bergen County, currently teaching at Yeshivat Chovevei Torah and SAR High School, where he is also a department chair. He has served or continues to serve on the steering committee of the Orthodox Forum, as the plenum of the Orthodox Caucus, and on the board of the Association of Modern Orthodox Day Schools.

Helfgot has published articles in various journals such as Tradition, Tehumin, Jewish Action, Ten-Daat, Beit Yitzchak, Megadim, Alon Shvut, Or HaMizrach, The Orthodox Forum Series, The Jewish Week, The Jewish Standard, and Hamevaser.

In February 2019, a three quarters majority of the Rabbinical Council of Bergen County's (RCBC) board voted, after meeting twice, to amend its bylaws in order to remove Helfgot and Netivot Shalom from its affiliation over his hiring of a female rabbinic intern from Yeshivat Maharat. Helfgot, who was present at both meetings and addressed the council, issued a statement both praising the RCBC as an institution and expressing his "disagreement and disappointment" with its decision. The RCBC and Helfgot have since come to an agreement, with him and his synagogue remaining members in good standing with the organization.

Personal life 
Helfgot is married to Rachel Brenner. They have four children.

Published works 
  
 Helfgot, Nathaniel. Divrei Berakah U’Moed: Halakhic Essays on the Topics of Holidays and Blessings. Yeshivat Har Etzion.
 Community, Covenant, and Commitment: Selected Letters and Communications of Rabbi Joseph B. Soloveitchik (). Toras HaRav Foundation.
 The YCT Companion to the Book of Samuel

References

1963 births
Living people
Rabbis from New Jersey
People from Teaneck, New Jersey
Rabbi Isaac Elchanan Theological Seminary semikhah recipients
Yeshiva University alumni
Yeshivat Har Etzion
21st-century American Jews